Saqqara, also spelled Sakkara or Saccara in English , is an Egyptian village in the markaz (county) of Badrashin in the Giza Governorate, that contains ancient burial grounds of Egyptian royalty, serving as the necropolis for the ancient Egyptian capital, Memphis. Saqqara contains numerous pyramids, including the Pyramid of Djoser, sometimes referred to as the Step Tomb, and a number of mastaba tombs.

Saqqara contains the oldest complete stone building complex known in history, the Pyramid of Djoser, built during the Third Dynasty. Another sixteen Egyptian kings built pyramids at Saqqara, which are now in various states of preservation. High officials added private funeral monuments to this necropolis during the entire Pharaonic period. It remained an important complex for non-royal burials and cult ceremonies for more than 3000 years, well into Ptolemaic and Roman times.

North of the Saqqara site lies the Abusir pyramid complex, and to its south lies the Dahshur pyramid complex, and together with the Giza Pyramid complex to the far north comprise the Pyramid Fields of Memphis, or the Memphite Necropolis, which was designated as a World Heritage Site by UNESCO in 1979.

Some scholars believe that the name Saqqara is not derived from the ancient Egyptian funerary deity, Sokar, but from a local Berber tribe called the Beni Saqqar, despite the fact that a tribe of this name is not documented anywhere. Medieval authors also refer to the village as Ard as-Sadr.

History

Early Dynastic

 of nobles can be traced back to the First Dynasty, at the northern side of the Saqqara plateau. During this time, the royal burial ground was at Abydos. The first royal burials at Saqqara, comprising underground galleries, date to the Second Dynasty. The last Second Dynasty king, Khasekhemwy, was buried in his tomb at Abydos, but also built a funerary monument at Saqqara consisting of a large rectangular enclosure, known as Gisr el-Mudir. It probably inspired the monumental enclosure wall around the Step Pyramid complex. Djoser's funerary complex, built by the royal architect Imhotep, further comprises a large number of dummy buildings and a secondary mastaba (the so-called 'Southern Tomb'). French architect and Egyptologist Jean-Philippe Lauer spent the greater part of his life excavating and restoring Djoser's funerary complex.

Early Dynastic monuments
tomb of king Hotepsekhemwy or Raneb
tomb of king Nynetjer
Buried Pyramid, funerary complex of king Sekhemkhet
Gisr el-Mudir, funerary complex of king Khasekhemwy
Step Pyramid, funerary complex of king Djoser

Old Kingdom

Nearly all Fourth Dynasty kings chose a different location for their pyramids. During the second half of the Old Kingdom, under the Fifth and Sixth Dynasties, Saqqara was again the royal burial ground. The Fifth and Sixth Dynasty pyramids are not built wholly of massive stone blocks, but instead with a core consisting of rubble. Consequently, they are less well preserved than the world-famous pyramids built by the Fourth Dynasty kings at Giza. Unas, the last ruler of the Fifth Dynasty, was the first king to adorn the chambers in his pyramid with Pyramid Texts. During the Old Kingdom, it was customary for courtiers to be buried in mastaba tombs close to the pyramid of their king. Thus, clusters of private tombs were formed in Saqqara around the pyramid complexes of Unas and Teti.

Old Kingdom monuments
Mastabat al-Fir'aun, tomb of king Shepseskaf (Dynasty Four)
Pyramid of Userkaf of the Fifth Dynasty
Pyramid of Djedkare Isesi
Pyramid of king Menkauhor
Mastaba of Ti
Mastaba of the Two Brothers (Khnumhotep and Niankhkhnum)
Pyramid of Unas
Mastaba of Ptahhotep
Pyramid of Teti (Dynasty Six)
Mastaba of Mereruka
Mastaba of Kagemni
Mastaba of Akhethetep
Pyramid of Pepi I
Pyramid of Merenre
Pyramid complex of king Pepi II Neferkare
Tomb of Perneb (now in the Metropolitan Museum of Art of New York)

First Intermediate Period monuments
Pyramid of king Ibi (Dynasty Eight)

Middle Kingdom
From the Middle Kingdom onward, Memphis was no longer the capital of the country, and kings built their funerary complexes elsewhere. Few private monuments from this period have been found at Saqqara.

Second Intermediate Period monuments
Pyramid of king Khendjer (Dynasty Thirteen)
Pyramid of an unknown king

New Kingdom

During the New Kingdom, Memphis was an important administrative and military centre, being the capital after the Amaran Period. From the Eighteenth Dynasty onward, many high officials built tombs at Saqqara. While still a general, Horemheb built a large tomb here, although he later was buried as pharaoh in the Valley of the Kings at Thebes. Other important tombs belong to the vizier Aperel, the vizier Neferronpet, the artist Thutmose, and the wet-nurse of Tutankhamun, Maia.

Many monuments from earlier periods were still standing, but dilapidated by this period. Prince Khaemweset, son of Pharaoh Ramesses II, made repairs to buildings at Saqqara. Among other things, he restored the Pyramid of Unas and added an inscription to its south face to commemorate the restoration. He enlarged the Serapeum, the burial site of the mummified Apis bulls, and was later buried in the catacombs. The Serapeum, containing one undisturbed interment of an Apis bull and the tomb of Khaemweset, were rediscovered by the French Egyptologist Auguste Mariette in 1851.

New Kingdom monuments
Several clusters of tombs of high officials, among which the tombs of Horemheb and of Maya and Merit. Reliefs and statues from these two tombs are on display in the National Museum of Antiquities at Leiden, the Netherlands, and in the British Museum, London.

After the New Kingdom
During the periods after the New Kingdom, when several cities in the Delta served as capital of Egypt, Saqqara remained in use as a burial ground for nobles. Moreover, the area became an important destination for pilgrims to a number of cult centres. Activities sprang up around the Serapeum, and extensive underground galleries were cut into the rock as burial sites for large numbers of mummified ibises, baboons, cats, dogs, and falcons.

Monuments of the Late Period, the Graeco-Roman and later periods
Several shaft tombs of officials of the Late Period
Serapeum (the larger part dating to the Ptolemaeic Period)
The so-called 'Philosophers circle', a monument to important Greek thinkers and poets, consisting of statues of Hesiod, Homer, Pindar, Plato, and others (Ptolemaeic)
Several Coptic monasteries, among which the Monastery of Apa Jeremias (Byzantine and Early Islamic Periods)

Site looting during 2011 protests
Saqqara and the surrounding areas of Abusir and Dahshur suffered damage by looters during the 2011 Egyptian protests. Store rooms were broken into, but the monuments were mostly unharmed.

Recent Discoveries

2010s
During routine excavations in 2011 at the dog catacomb in Saqqara necropolis, an excavation team led by Salima Ikram and an international team of researchers led by Paul Nicholson of Cardiff University uncovered almost eight million animal mummies at the burial site next to the sacred temple of Anubis. It is thought that the mummified animals, mostly dogs, were intended to pass on the prayers of their owners to their deities.

In July 2018, German-Egyptian researchers’ team head by Ramadan Badry Hussein of the University of Tübingen reported the discovery of an extremely rare gilded burial mask that probably dates from the Saite-Persian period in a partly damaged wooden coffin. The last time a similar mask was found was in 1939. The eyes were covered with obsidian, calcite, and black hued gemstone possibly onyx. "The finding of this mask could be called a sensation. Very few masks of precious metal have been preserved to the present day, because the tombs of most Ancient Egyptian dignitaries were looted in ancient times." said Hussein.

In September 2018, several dozen cache of mummies dating 2,000 years back were found by a team of Polish archaeologists led by Kamil Kuraszkiewicz from the Faculty of Oriental Studies of the University of Warsaw. The Polish-Egyptian expedition works under the auspices of the Polish Centre of Mediterranean Archaeology University of Warsaw. Investigations were carried out for over two decades in the area to the west of the Djoser Pyramid. The most important discoveries include the tomb of vizier Merefnebef with a funerary chapel decorated with multi-colored reliefs, which was uncovered in 1997. as well as the tomb of courtier Nyankhnefertem uncovered in 2003. The expedition also explored two necropoles. Archaeologists revealed several dozen graves of noblemen from the period of the 6th Dynasty, dating to the 24th–21st century BC, and 500 graves of indigent people dating approximately to the 6th century BC – 1st century AD. Most of the bodies were poorly preserved and all organic materials, including the wooden caskets, had decayed. The tombs discovered most recently (in 2018) form part of the younger, so-called Upper Necropolis.

The research of the Polish-Egyptian expedition also focuses on the interpretation of the so-called Dry Moat, a vast trench hewn around the Djoser Pyramid. The most recent discoveries confirm the hypothesis that the Dry Moat was a model of the pharaoh's journey to the netherworld, a road the deceased ruler had to follow to attain eternal life.

In November 2018, an Egyptian archaeological mission located seven ancient Egyptian tombs at the ancient necropolis of Saqqara. Three of the tombs were used for cats, some dating back to the Fifth and Sixth Dynasties, while one of four other sarcophagi was unsealed. Among the dozens of cat mummies were 100 wooden and gilded statues of cats and one in bronze dedicated to the cat goddess Bastet, and funerary items dating back to the 12th Dynasty. Another of the seven tombs belongs to Khufu-Imhat, the overseer of buildings in the royal palace.

Also in November 2018, a collection of rare mummified scarab beetles was unearthed in two sarcophagi, one of which was decorated with paintings of large black beetles.

Also in November 2018, the Egyptian government announced the discovery at Saqqara of a previously unknown 4,400-year-old tomb. It belongs to Wahtye, a high-ranking priest who served under King Neferirkare Kakai during the Fifth Dynasty, and his wife, four children and mother. It contains more than fifty sculptures, and is painted with scenes of the family, wine and pottery making, musical performances, sailing, hunting, and furniture making.

On 13 April 2019, an expedition led by a member of the Czech Institute of Egyptology, Mohamed Megahed, discovered a 4,000-year-old tomb near Egypt's Saqqara Necropolis. Archaeologists confirmed that the tomb belonged to an influential person named Khuwy, who lived in Egypt during the 5th Dynasty. "The L-shaped Khuwy tomb starts with a small corridor heading downwards into an antechamber and from there a larger chamber with painted reliefs depicting the tomb owner seated at an offerings table", reported Megahed. Some paintings maintained their brightness over a long time in the tomb. Mainly made of white limestone bricks, the tomb had a tunnel entrance generally typical for pyramids. Archaeologists say that there might be a connection between Khuwy and pharaoh because the mausoleum was found near the pyramid of Egyptian Pharaoh Djedkare Isesi, who ruled during that time.

In October 2019, a cache of 30 coffins with mummies was discovered, at the time Egypt's largest in more than a century and the first cache to be discovered by a solely Egyptian mission. The coffins were stacked on top of each other and arranged in two rows about three feet below the sandy surface. The first coffin's head was partially exposed in the sand, which led to the cache's discovery. Two of the coffins belonged to children, a rare occurrence in archeology. Mostafa Waziri, secretary general of the Supreme Council of Antiquities, explained that one could identify the mummy's gender by the shape of the hands on the coffin, open hands being female and hands balled into fists being male. The colors of the coffin inscriptions---made from limestone, red oak, turquoise, and other natural stones mixed with eggwhites—stayed intact, and the mixture of egg yolk and candle wax spread over the coffins to make them shine was still visible, making this a unique find.

2020s

On April 28, 2020, archeologists announced they had found a 30-foot-deep (9 meter) burial shaft containing five limestone sarcophagi, four wooden coffins with human mummies, and an array of other artifacts. Among them were 365 faience ushabti and a small wooden obelisk about 40 centimeters tall that had been painted with depictions of Horus, Isis and Nepthys.

On 3 October 2020, Khalid el-Anany, Egypt's tourism and antiquities minister announced the discovery of at least 59 sealed sarcophagi with mummies more than 2,600 years old. Archaeologists also revealed the 20 statues of Ptah-Soker and a carved 35-centimeter tall bronze statue of god Nefertem.

On 19 October 2020, the Ministry of Tourism and Antiquities announced the discovery of gilded, wooden statues and more than 80 coffins in three burial shafts. Officials believed the coffins contain senior officials and priests from the 26th Dynasty.

In November 2020, archaeologists unearthed more than 100 delicately painted wooden coffins dating to the 26th Dynasty and 40 statues of the local goddess Ptah Soker. Other artifacts discovered include funeral masks, canopic jars and 1,000 ceramic amulets. “This discovery is very important because it proves that Saqqara was the main burial of the 26th Dynasty,” said Zahi Hawass, an Egyptologist and Egypt's former Minister of State for Antiquities Affairs.

In January 2021, the tourism and antiquities ministry announced the discovery of more than 50 wooden sarcophagi in 52 burial shafts which date back to the New Kingdom period, each around 30 to 40 feet deep,  and a 13 ft-long papyrus that contains texts from Chapter 17 of the Book of the Dead. The papyrus scroll belonged to a man named Bu-Khaa-Af, whose name is written on it, on his sarcophagus, and on four ushabtis. Excerpts from the Book of the Dead were also painted onto the surface of other coffins. Also found in the shafts were wooden funerary masks, board games, a shrine dedicated to god of the dead Anubis, bird-shaped artifacts and a bronze axe. A limestone stelae dated to the reign of Ramesses II was found in one of the shafts, depicting the overseer of the king's military chariot Kha-Ptah and his wife Mwt-em-wia worshipping Osiris and sitting with six of their children.

Also in January 2021, a team of archaeologists led by Zahi Hawass found the funerary temple of Naert or Narat and three warehouses made of bricks attached to the southeastern side for storage of temple provisions, offerings and tools. Researchers also revealed that Narat's name was engraved on a fallen obelisk near the main entrance. Previously unknown to researchers, Naert was a wife of Teti, the first king of the sixth dynasty.

In November 2021, archeologists from Cairo University discovered several tombs, including that of Batah-M-Woya, chief treasurer during the reign of Ramesses II, and of a military leader named Hor Mohib.

In March 2022, five 4000-year-old tombs belonging to senior officials from the Old Kingdom and First Intermediary Period were discovered. On 30 May 2022, 250 sarcophagi and 150 statuettes were displayed at Saqqara, dated back to the Late Period more than 2,500 years ago, in addition to a 9-meter-long papyrus scroll which could be a depiction of a chapter of the Book of the Dead.

In May 2022, the discovery of the nearly 4,300-year-old tomb of an ancient Egyptian high-ranked person who handled royal, sealed documents of pharaoh was announced. According to University of Warsaw’s Polish Centre of Mediterranean Archaeology, the elaborately decorated tomb belonged to a man named Mehtjetju who served as a priest and an inspector of the royal property. Kamil O. Kuraszkiewicz, expedition director stated that Mehtjetju most likely lived at about the same time, at some point during the reigns of the first three rulers of the Sixth Dynasty: Teti, Userkare and Pepy I.

In January 2023, Zahi Hawass announced the discovery of four tombs at Saqqara including a 4,300-year-old mummy to a man named Hekashepes covered with gold, in addition to finds date back to the 5th and 6th dynasties, such as a priest inspector named Khnumdjedef, secret keeper called Meri and a judge and writer named Fetek.

See also
Bubasteum
List of Egyptian pyramids
Saqqara Bird
Saqqara Tablet
Secrets of the Saqqara Tomb, 2020 documentary

References

External links

Information on Saqqara
Saqqara.nl (Friends of Saqqara Foundation)
Discoveries on the site from February 2007
University of Pennsylvania Museum excavations at Saqqara
Saqqara Information - Historvius

 
Giza Governorate
Memphis, Egypt
Tourist attractions in Egypt